The 2019 ACC women's basketball tournament, concluded the 2018–19 season of the Atlantic Coast Conference, which was held at Greensboro Coliseum in Greensboro, North Carolina, from March 6–10, 2019. Notre Dame, which finished atop the ACC regular-season table along with Louisville, won the tournament and with it the ACC's automatic bid to the 2019 NCAA Women's Division I Basketball Tournament.

Seeds
Seeding was determine based on the regular season.  Each team played 16 regular season games, at least one versus each other team in the ACC.

Schedule
All games will be televised on the Raycom network within the ACC footprint and simulcast nationally on the ESPN networks denoted below.

Bracket

All-Tournament Teams

See also

2019 ACC men's basketball tournament

References

2018–19 Atlantic Coast Conference women's basketball season
ACC women's basketball tournament
Basketball competitions in Greensboro, North Carolina
ACC Women's Basketball
Women's sports in North Carolina
College sports in North Carolina